The 2012–13 season of the Liga I Feminin was the 23rd season of Romania's premier women's football league. Olimpia Cluj were the defending champions and defended their title.

The season was the last named Liga I and prepared the restructuring of the Romanian football pyramid. Next season a second-level league was created.

Changes from 2011 to 2012
 18 teams play in the league, two less than last season.
 The league is now played in three divisions instead of two. After a double round robin, i.e. 18 matches per team, the top two teams will move on to play the championship round.
 Because of the creation of the new Superliga the third placed teams from each group will play a play-off with the top two qualifying for next season's Superliga.
 The fourth to sixth placed teams are divided into two groups that play a round-robin again. Though all clubs will start in next year's second-level league, the 2013–2014 Liga I.

Standings

First stage
Each team plays 10 games.

East

West

South

Championship play-off
The top two of each group advanced to the final stage. The six teams play each other two times for a total of ten games. In contrast to last season, there were no bonus points given for winning their first stage division. Blue Angel Cristian Brasov withdrew their team after the season.

Superliga qualification
Played by the third placed teams from the first stage. Two were supposed to qualify, but after Blue Angel withdrew, all qualified.

Play-out
Played by teams placed fourth to sixth in the first stage. CS Negrea Reşiţa were disallowed to participate. All teams start in the Liga I next season.

Group A

Group B

References

External links
 Official site
 Season on soccerway.com

Rom
Fem
Romanian Superliga (women's football) seasons